Nasum Ahmed (born 5 December 1994) is a Bangladeshi cricketer who plays for Sylhet Division in domestic cricket. He made his international debut for the Bangladesh cricket team in March 2021.

Early life and family
Nasum Ahmed was born on 5 December 1994 to Bengali Muslim parents in Jalalabad, Sylhet. His grandfather migrated to Sylhet in 1958 from their ancestral home which is in the village of Mardapur in Derai, Sunamganj District.

Career
In November 2019, Nasum was selected to play for the Chattogram Challengers in the 2019–20 Bangladesh Premier League.

In March 2020, Nasum was named in Bangladesh's Twenty20 International (T20I) squad for their series against Zimbabwe. In January 2021, he was one of four uncapped players to be named in a preliminary squad for the One Day International (ODI) series against the West Indies. In February 2021, he was named in Bangladesh's squad for their series against New Zealand. He made his T20I debut for Bangladesh on 28 March 2021, against New Zealand.

On 3 August 2021, in a T20 match against Australia, Nasum took 4 wickets giving away 19 runs helping Bangladesh to win against Australia in T20 for the first time.

On 8 September 2021, in a T20 match against New Zealand, Nasum took four wickets giving away 10 runs, helping Bangladesh to win a T20 series against New Zealand for the first time. He was also named as the man of the match. Later the same month, he was named in Bangladesh's squad for the 2021 ICC Men's T20 World Cup.

In February 2022, he was named in Bangladesh's One Day International (ODI) squad for their series against Afghanistan. In March 2022, he was named in Bangladesh's ODI squad for their series against South Africa. In May 2022, he was again named in Bangladesh's ODI squad, this time for their series against the West Indies. He made his ODI debut on 10 July 2022, for Bangladesh against the West Indies.

References

External links
 

1994 births
Living people
Bangladeshi cricketers
Bangladesh One Day International cricketers
Bangladesh Twenty20 International cricketers
Gazi Group cricketers
Sylhet Division cricketers
People from Sylhet
People from Derai Upazila
21st-century Bengalis
21st-century Muslims
Bangladeshi Sunni Muslims